Viktor Lazić (Belgrade, 24 January 1985) is Serbian modern travel writers and a lawyer. Viktor is a PhD candidate of Ancient Chinese law, authorized translator, holder of a tour guide license, Ambassador of the Serbian Bibliophilic Society, was associate of the Geographical Institute "Jovan Cvijić" of Serbian Academy of Science and Arts (2009–2011), philatelist and numismatist. He is founder and president of the Society for Culture, Art and International Cooperation "Adligat", CEO of Library Lazic (since 1882), Book and Travel Museum and Museum of Serbian Literature within this Association. He is a member of the Association of Writers of Serbia.

Biography
Viktor was born in 1985. He was the honors student of the Law High School "9. May" in Belgrade and graduated from the Faculty of Law of the University of Belgrade. He is currently working on a doctorate degree in the field of Chinese law with subject "Confucianism and Legalism as the dominant schools of Chinese law". He deals with a wide range of business, cultural and social activities, and is the recipient of many awards and certificates. He speaks English, Russian and German, in addition to his native Serbian.

Travel and travel books
Lazic is a travel writer for the biggest Serbian publishing house "Laguna". He has visited 90 countries on six continents. He spent ten years travelling the world with a minimum of financial resources. He became known for driving around the globe in an old Russian Lada Niva.

His greatest journey lasted 421 days during 2009/2010, which is described in the book "The Great Adventure." During the trip, he regularly wrote for the daily newspapers Press from Belgrade. He started that trip from Kosovo, Dečani monastery. He toured much of Europe in a Jeep and reached the northernmost point of the European continent, North Cape, from where he proceeded to Russia. Without an accurate plan of movement, he visited thousands of cities, towns and villages. In October 2009. he reached the border of North Korea where the journey continued by other means of transport through Asia and Australia. He drove back to Serbia from Vladivostok, crossing alone Gobi desert, where he faced biggest car failure.

In July 2011 he started five-month journey around the shores of the Black Sea. He visited rarely visited regions of Southeast Turkey and Iraq, continuing to Georgia, Azerbaijan and Armenia. At the border of South Ossetia he was arrested by local authorities and held in solitary confinement under unclear charges.  His immediate liberation was demanded by the International Federation of Journalists, Reporters Without Borders, Serbian Association of Writers and many other organizations and individuals. After he was freed he continued journey through Georgia including Abkhazia, Russia, Ukraine, Moldova (including Transnistria) and Romania.

The travel novels of Viktor Lazić are known to describe areas «off the beaten track»: he discovers new travel destinations, culture and places of natural beauty that known to few people. In his travel novels, the most important is contact with residents, explaining different world views and different ways of life. Particular media attention in the Balkans was drawn by his description of the life of pirates in Malacca Straits, life of believers of sects of the self-proclaimed Jesus, Vizarion, in Siberia, life of ex-cannibal tribes and matriarchal tribes in Indonesia.

Library and Museum
Viktor Lazic is the heir of two-hundred-year-long tradition of a family library that operated in Voyvodina from 1882 until 1977. During his travels, he spends most of his resources on finding new books and artifacts for this library and Book and Travel Museum in Belgrade. He was the recipient of the Honorary citizen of Voždovac award in 2019 and the Benefactor award in 2020.

List of published books
 Goethe – poetry and truth, Stručna knjiga, Beograd, Law High School «9. may», Belgrade, 2003
 Wondering the Land of Smiles, Bigraf Plus, Belgrade, 2006 with CD
 Wondering the Land of Smiles (II edition), Treći Trg, Belgrade, 2008
 Wondering the Land of Smiles (III edition), Prosveta, Belgrade, 2012
 Great Adventure, Press Publishing Group, Belgrade, 2010
 In the heart of Sumatra, Laguna, Belgrade, 2011
 In the heart of Sumatra (II edition), Laguna, Belgrade, 2012
 On the doors of the East, Laguna, Belgrade, 2015

Membership in the organizations and associations
 Association of Writers of Serbia, Belgrade
 Association of Journalists of Serbia, Belgrade
 Serbian Bibliophile Society (ambassador), Belgrade
 Association of Tourist Guides of Serbia (honorary member), Belgrade
 Association of Scientific and Technical Translators of Serbia, Belgrade
 Association of Serbian-Indonesian friendship «Nusantara», Belgrade
 Association of Serbian-Cubanese friendship, Belgrade
 Goethe Society, Belgrade
 Association for development and improvement of tourism of Serbia, Belgrade (founding member)

References

Sources
 
 http://www.laguna.rs/n1636_knjiga_u_srcu_sumatre_laguna.html (In Serbian)

External links
 Nader Alsarras: A Bunker for Books: Bibliophilia in Belgrade, DW-TV, 5 May 2018 (YouTube)

1985 births
Living people
Writers from Belgrade
Serbian non-fiction writers
Serbian journalists